Il Figlio delle selve is an opera in three acts by Ignaz Holzbauer to a libretto by Carlo Sigismondo Capece premiered June 1753 at the Schlosstheater Schwetzingen for Kurfürst Carl Theodor zu Mannheim, securing Holzbauer employment as kapellmeister. The opera was revived by Staats Theater Mainz for the Schwetzingen Festival 2003, and again for the Festival de Radio France et Montpellier Languedoc Roussillon in July 2005.

References

Operas
1753 operas
Operas by Ignaz Holzbauer